Kudki, Kurki or Kudaki is a small village, near Pali city in Jaitaran tehsil of Pali district in Indian state of Rajasthan. This village is located in north of Pali district near Nagaur district border. This village is birthplace of Mira Bai, whose father Ratan Singh Rathore was the ruler of Kurki.

Demographics

Kudki village population is 3,927 according to census 2001, where male population is 1,982 while female population is 1,945.

References

Villages in Pali district